Filip Rýdel (born 30 March 1984) is a Czech football player. His position is midfield. He currently plays for Czech club SK Dynamo České Budějovice.

Honours

Club

 FC Viktoria Plzeň
 Czech Cup: 2010

External links
 
 

1984 births
Living people
Czech footballers
Czech Republic youth international footballers
Czech Republic under-21 international footballers
Czech First League players
SK Sigma Olomouc players
MFK Karviná players
FC Fastav Zlín players
FC Viktoria Plzeň players
FC Zbrojovka Brno players
SK Dynamo České Budějovice players
Sportspeople from Olomouc
Association football midfielders